Nicola Hobbs (born 10 May 1987) is an English footballer who last signed as a goalkeeper for Sheffield United ahead of the 2018/2019 FA WSL 2 season.  However, she left the club in October after finding it impossible to combine her work commitments and playing career.  She had previously played for London Bees in the FA WSL 2, the Doncaster Rovers Belles, Lincoln Ladies, Everton, Blackburn Rovers, and Norwich City. She has represented England up to Under 23 level. Outside of football, she works full-time as a firefighter.

Honours

Everton
FA Women's Cup (1): 2009–10

References

External links
 

Living people
1987 births
Blackburn Rovers L.F.C. players
British firefighters
Doncaster Rovers Belles L.F.C. players
England women's under-23 international footballers
English women's footballers
Everton F.C. (women) players
FA Women's National League players
Women's Super League players
Notts County L.F.C. players
Footballers from Portsmouth
Women's association football goalkeepers
London Bees players
Sheffield United W.F.C. players